The Holy Synod of the Russian Orthodox Church serves by Church statute as the supreme administrative governing body of the Russian Orthodox Church in the periods between Bishops' Councils.

Members

Chairman
 Kirill – Patriarch of Moscow and All Russia

Permanent members 
 by the cathedra
 Paul (Ponomaryov) – Metropolitan of Krutitsy and Kolomna
 Barsanophius (Sudakov) – Metropolitan of St. Petersburg and Ladoga
  – Metropolitan of Minsk and Slutsk, Patriarchal Exarch of All Belarus
 Vladimir (Cantarean) – Metropolitan of Chișinău and All Moldova
 Alexander (Mogilyov) – Metropolitan of Astana and Kazakhstan
 Vincent (Morar) – Metropolitan of Central Asia

 ex officio
 Anthony (Sevryuk) – Metropolitan of Volokolamsk, chairman of the Department for External Church Relations of the Moscow Patriarchate

Former members 
 by the cathedra
 Onuphrius (Berezovsky) – Metropolitan of Kyiv and all Ukraine (formerly; de facto)

See also 
 Most Holy Synod

References 

Russian Orthodox Church
Governing assemblies of religious organizations